Sergey Khoretsky (born 31 March 1956) is a Belarusian sailor. He competed in the Star event at the 1996 Summer Olympics.

References

External links
 

1956 births
Living people
Belarusian male sailors (sport)
Olympic sailors of Belarus
Sailors at the 1996 Summer Olympics – Star
Sportspeople from Minsk